Ladhoo or Ladhu is a village in the Pulwama district of Jammu and Kashmir, India. It is situated on the Jhelum River and of all villages in Pampore Constituency is one of the largest village. It is spread over an area of  including a long stretch of very famous trekking spot known as Wasturwan. This hill is also referred as 'Veshrivan' by some scholars and is said to be a store house of many myths and truths for the people living in its vicinity.

As per the census of 2011, the household capacity is 823 and the total population is 4604. The male-to-female ratio is 1000:973.

Quarrying and farming provide employment for most of the residents, either directly or indirectly.
Products include saffron, almonds, walnuts, pears, paddy, and maize.

Literacy
The literacy rate of Ladhoo is 65.33%. Male literacy is at 77.83% while female literacy stands at 52.8%. There are three private schools (up to primary level), five government schools (up to primary level) and a government higher secondary school and the names are given in the table below.

Religion

The majority of the population is Muslim, with a Hindu minority.

They all live together in peace and harmony, they also take part in one another's festivals. There are around 15 mosques and four temples built in the village and among them is the Ancient Temple which is included in the list of Historical monuments of India and is under the care of archaeological survey of India (ASI), circle srinagar. The other notable religious sites of the village include Sheikh-ul-Alam shrine and Samadhi Of Jeevan Sahib.

Important locations 

The Ancient Temple is located by a pond named Sanz Har Nag and dates back to the 8th century AD. The temple is externally square but circular internally. The southwest entrance has an arch surmounted by a pediment.
Considering the topology, nature has designed this village so adequate that it had remained the seat of learning for many saints and Sufis and get spiritual enlightenment, one among them is one of the valleys highly praised Sufi saint popularly known as Alamdare Kashmir Sheikh-ul-Aalam also known as Nund Rishi has spent an ample amount of time here (12 years), other saints visited here include Mir Syed Ali Hamadani, Baba Raqam ud din and Jeevan Sahib and all of them have chosen different residing  sites in the village which are worth to mention as Lopan pal, bank of sanz haer nag, ghope bal and Gousen nar respectively.

Ladhoo is also near a hiking spot known as Wasturwan.

References

Villages in Pulwama district
Jammu and Kashmir articles missing geocoordinate data
Coordinates on Wikidata
Short description matches Wikidata
Articles with short description